Jhamela (English: Problem) is a 1953 Hindi comedy thriller film produced and directed by Bhagwan, for his Bhagwan Art Productions. The film was a repeat formula Bhagwan had earlier used in his commercially successful film Albela (1951). Albela with its "rumba-samba beats" in the composition of music director C. Ramchandra's songs, its comedy, and melodramatic story, had turned out to be an "all-time hit". With music again composed by C. Ramachandra, and casting actress Geeta Bali, Bhagwan tried to recreate the magic of Albela with little success. The film was termed a "semi-hit" at the box-office. It starred Geeta Bali, Bhagwan, Shakuntala, Sunder, Anwar Hussain and  Badri Prasad.

Cast
 Geeta Bali
 Bhagwan
 Sunder
 Anwar Hussain 
 Badri Prasad
 Baby Shakuntala

Soundtrack
The music was composed by C. Ramchandra, who had previously given hit music for Albela (1951). According to C. Ramchandra, his inspiration for the "unique beat" for  Albela (1951) and Jhamela (1953), came from the "funeral dance music he  heard in Madras". One of the popular song was "Dekho Ji Dekho Mera Dil Le Ke" sung by Lata Mangeshkar. Rajendra Krishan wrote the lyrics for the film. The playback singers were Lata Mangeshkar, C Ramchandra (Chitalkar), Meena Kapoor and Francis Vaz.

Songlist

References

External links 
 

1953 films
1953 drama films
1950s Hindi-language films
Films scored by C. Ramchandra
Indian black-and-white films
Indian comedy thriller films
1950s comedy thriller films